Komov (from ком meaning lump) is a Russian masculine surname, its feminine counterpart is Komova. It may refer to
Gennady Komov, fictional character in Boris and Arkady Strugatsky's series of science fiction novels 
Viktoria Komova (born 1995), Russian artistic gymnast

Russian-language surnames